Adieu Blaireau (Farewell Blaireau) is a 1985 film directed by Bob Decout.

The picture stars Philippe Léotard, Annie Girardot and Juliette Binoche and premiered at the 1985 Cognac Festival du Film Policier.

Cast 
 Philippe Léotard : Fred
 Annie Girardot : Colette
 Jacques Penot : Gégé
 Christian Marquand : Victor
 Juliette Binoche : Brigitte B., aka "B.B"
 Amidou : Poupée
 Albert Dray : Boris
 Yves Rénier : "Professeur"
 John Dobrynine : Killer
 Agathe Gil : Gigi
 Pierre Arditi : La Grenouille
 Hubert Deschamps : Drunk
 Serge Marquand : Cafe owner

Soundtrack
The song "Mama", sung by the French singer Janet, known for the 1972 song "Bénie Soit La Pluie" / "Le Chocolat", was released as a single in 1985.

References

External links
 .

1985 films
French crime drama films
1980s French-language films
1980s French films
French crime thriller films